Peremoha is a village in the Kharkiv Raion, Kharkiv Oblast (province) of eastern Ukraine. It is part of the Lyptsi rural hromada, one of the hromadas of Ukraine.

References

Villages in Kharkiv Raion